In computing, cp is a command in various Unix and Unix-like operating systems for copying files and directories. The command has three principal modes of operation, expressed by the types of arguments presented to the program for copying a file to another file, one or more files to a directory, or for copying entire directories to another directory.

The utility further accepts various command line option flags to detail the operations performed. The two major specifications are POSIX cp and GNU cp. GNU cp has many additional options over the POSIX version.

The command is also available in the EFI shell.

History
cp was part of Version 1 Unix. The version of cp bundled in GNU coreutils was written by Torbjorn Granlund, David MacKenzie, and Jim Meyering.

Operating modes
cp has three principal modes of operation. These modes are inferred from the type and count of arguments presented to the program upon invocation.
When the program has two arguments of path names to files, the program copies the contents of the first file to the second file, creating the second file if necessary.
When the program has one or more arguments of path names of files and following those an argument of a path to a directory, then the program copies each source file to the destination directory, creating any files not already existing.
When the program's arguments are the path names to two directories, cp copies all files in the source directory to the destination directory, creating any files or directories needed. This mode of operation requires an additional option flag, typically  r, to indicate the recursive copying of directories. If the destination directory already exists, the source is copied into the destination, while a new directory is created if the destination does not exist.

Usage 
Copying a file to another file:
 cp [-fHip][--] sourcefile targetfile

Copying file(s) to a directory
 cp [-fHip] [--] sourcefile... targetdirectory

Copying a directory to a directory (-r or -R must be used)
 cp -r|-R [-fHip] [--]  sourcedirectory... targetdirectory

Option flags
-f (force) – specifies removal of the target file if it cannot be opened for write operations. The removal precedes any copying performed by the cp command.
 -H (dereference) – makes the cp command follow symbolic links (symlinks) so that the destination has the target file rather than a symlink to the target.
-i (interactive) – prompts with the name of a file to be overwritten. This occurs if the TargetDirectory or TargetFile parameter contains a file with the same name as a file specified in the SourceFile or SourceDirectory parameter. If one enters y (or the locale's equivalent of y), the cp command continues. Any other answer prevents the cp command from overwriting the file.
-n (no clobbering) – prevents accidentally overwriting any files
-p (preserve) – the -p flag preserves the following characteristics of each source path in the corresponding target: the time of the last data modification and the time of the last access, the ownership (only if it has permissions to do this), and the file permission-bits.
-R or -r (recursive) – copy directories recursively

 Examples 
Creating a copy of a file in the current directory:
 cp prog.c prog.bak
This copies prog.c to prog.bak. If the prog.bak file does not already exist, the cp command creates it. If it does exist, the cp command replaces its contents with the contents of the prog.c file.

Copy two files in the current directory into another directory:
 cp jones smith /home/nick/clients
This copies the files jones to /home/nick/clients/jones and smith to /home/nick/clients/smith.

Copy a file to a new file and preserve the modification date, time, and access control list associated with the source file:
 cp -p smith smith.jr
This copies the smith file to the smith.jr file. Instead of creating the file with the current date and time stamp, the system gives the smith.jr file the same date and time as the smith file. The smith.jr file also inherits the smith file's access control protection.

Copy a directory, including all its files and subdirectories, to another directory:
 cp -R /home/nick/clients /home/nick/customers
This copies the directory clients, including all its files, subdirectories, and the files in those subdirectories, to the directory customers/clients. Some Unix systems behave differently in this mode, depending on the termination of directory paths. Using cp -R /home/nick/clients/ /home/nick/customers on a GNU system it behaves as expected; however, on a BSD system, it copies all the contents of the "clients" directory, instead of the directory clients'' itself. (with or without trailing slash).

The copying of a file to an existing file is performed by opening the existing file in update mode, thereby preserving the files inode, which requires write access and results in the target file retaining the permissions it had originally.

Related Unix commands 
 cpio – copy an entire directory structure from one place to another
 tar – create an archive of files
 link – system call to create a link to a file or directory
 ln – create a link to a file or directory
 mv – move a file or directory
 rm – remove a file or directory
 unlink – system call to remove a file or directory
 chmod – change the mode (aka permissions) on a file or directory
 chown – change ownership on a file or directory
 chgrp – change group on a file or directory
 uucp – unix to unix copy
 scp – secure copy over SSH
 progress, Linux tool to show progress for cp, mv, dd.

See also 

GNU Core Utilities 
List of Unix commands
rsync

References

External links
 
 
 
 
 
 
 

Standard Unix programs
Unix SUS2008 utilities
File copy utilities
Plan 9 commands
Inferno (operating system) commands
IBM i Qshell commands